Marina Agoues Márquez is a Spanish football striker, currently playing for SD Eibar.

As an Under-19 international she played the 2011 U-19 European Championship.

References

External links
Profile at Txapeldunak.com 

1992 births
Living people
People from Zarautz
Sportspeople from Gipuzkoa
Footballers from the Basque Country (autonomous community)
Spanish women's footballers
Women's association football midfielders
Real Sociedad (women) players
Oiartzun KE players
Santa Teresa CD players
Primera División (women) players
Spain women's youth international footballers